Rachicerus nitidus is a species of fly in the family Xylophagidae.

Distribution
Canada, United States.

References

Xylophagidae
Insects described in 1903
Taxa named by Charles Willison Johnson
Diptera of North America